Mindarie is a small town in the Murray Mallee of South Australia between Karoonda and Loxton. The town was gazetted in 1912. The name Mindarie is believed to originate from the Dieri Aboriginal language, and possibly means "festival to invoke peace".

Mindarie was a stop on the Barmera railway line which opened in 1912. Mindarie is no longer a stop on what is now the Loxton railway line.

Mindarie school was founded in 1916, initially being taught in the town institute hall. The school received its own building in 1929. The Mindarie school has been replaced by East Murray Area School which is located about 10 km northwest of Mindarie. It educates about 50 students from Reception to Year 12 in an isolated location.

Mindarie is home to the Murray Zircon heavy mineral sands mine.

Together with nearby Halidon, it hosts the Mindarie-Halidon Races in September each year, which is known as the Melbourne Cup of the Mallee.

The August 2016 Australian census reported that Mindarie had a population of 38.

References

External links
Place Names Search: MINDARIE

Towns in South Australia